Matthew Allen Hughes (born October 13, 1973) is an American retired mixed martial artist with a background in wrestling. Widely considered among the greatest fighters in the history of MMA, he is a former two-time UFC Welterweight Champion, UFC Hall of Fame inductee, and NJCAA Hall of Fame inductee. During his tenures in the Ultimate Fighting Championship, Hughes put together two separate six-fight winning streaks, defeated all the available opposition in the welterweight division, and defended the belt a then-record seven times. In May 2010, Hughes became the eighth inductee into the UFC Hall of Fame.

During his reign, Hughes was considered the #1 pound-for-pound mixed martial artist in the world. He was also regarded by many analysts and several media outlets as one of the greatest welterweight fighters of all time, as well as one of the greatest pound-for-pound fighters in the sport's history.

A long-time member of Miletich Fighting Systems, Hughes left the Miletich camp in late 2007 to start Team Hughes. In 2008, Hughes published his autobiography, Made in America, which made the New York Times bestseller list. In 2011, Hughes became host of Outdoor Channel's Trophy Hunters TV. Hughes has no nickname, although because of his successes against Gracie Brazilian jiu-jitsu (BJJ) practitioners such as Royce Gracie, Renzo Gracie, Ricardo Almeida, and Matt Serra, people often refer to him as "the Gracie Killer" (the same as Sakuraba's nickname). His mastery of submissions, and having submission wins over various black belt holders, are the reasons why Joe Rogan thinks he deserved to get a black belt for BJJ. Hughes never liked the idea, however, and considers himself primarily an amateur and submission wrestler.

Early life
Matthew Allen Hughes was born on October 13, 1973, in Hillsboro, Illinois. Hughes has two siblings, a sister and his twin brother, Mark. During high school they both participated in football and wrestling. Hughes went to Southwestern Illinois College in Belleville, Illinois, before transferring to Lincoln College, in Lincoln, Illinois and then on to Eastern Illinois University in Charleston, Illinois.

Wrestling
Hughes was a two-time 145 lb IHSA Class A state wrestling champion. He won in 1991 and 1992 while attending Hillsboro High School. During his junior and senior years, Matt went undefeated and won back-to-back state championships in the 145 lb class. Over the final three years of high school, he totaled 131 wins against only 2 losses, both during his sophomore year (sophomore 43–2; junior 43–0; senior 45-0).

His college career started at Southwestern Illinois College. Hughes placed fifth in the nation at 158 lb. After Southwestern dropped their wrestling program, Hughes transferred to Lincoln College, where he placed third in the nation, notching a 33–3 record for the Lynx.

After graduation Hughes continued wrestling at Eastern Illinois University, where he was a two-time NCAA Division I All-American placing eighth in 1996 and fifth in 1997 at 158 lb. He finished with an 80–15 record for Eastern Illinois.

Hughes competed in the prestigious ADCC Submission Wrestling World Championship, in which he held a record of 2–2, beating Ricardo Almeida and Jeremy Horn, and losing to Jeff Monson and Tito Ortiz.

Early career
Hughes made his mixed martial arts debut on January 1, 1998, at Joe Goytia's JKD Challenge. He slammed his opponent to the ground in just fifteen seconds, winning via KO. The slam became his signature move. He won his next fight via submission due to strikes. Hughes fought three times at Extreme Challenge 21, on October 17, 1998, defeating Victor Hunsaker via TKO and future UFC Middleweight Champion Dave Menne via unanimous decision. In the third fight of that night he lost to then-undefeated Dennis Hallman by technical submission (guillotine choke) at 0:17 of the first round. The result was announced as a KO. In the process, Hallman handed Hughes his first professional defeat.

Ultimate Fighting Championship
Hughes made his promotional debut at UFC 22: There Can Be Only One Champion, on September 24, 1999, defeating Bulgarian Valeri Ignatov via unanimous decision after three rounds.

He returned to the promotion at UFC 26: Ultimate Field of Dreams, where he defeated Marcelo Aguiar via TKO, throwing some elbows which cut Aguiar and forced the doctor to end the match. The stoppage came at 4:34 of the first round.

Hughes faced Dennis Hallman in a rematch at UFC 29: Defense of the Belts. At this point in their careers, Hallman was the only man to have defeated Hughes in MMA competition. Hughes lost the fight via armbar in only twenty seconds. When the bout started, Hughes lifted and brutally slammed Hallman to the mat, but was caught in the submission after landing in side-control.

Welterweight championship

Hughes won his first UFC World Welterweight title at UFC 34: High Voltage on November 2, 2001. In a come-from-behind fight, Hughes was caught in a triangle choke by then-champion Carlos Newton, but he lifted Newton in the air and slammed him to the mat, causing Newton to hit his head and lose consciousness just as Hughes was himself on the verge of blacking out from the choke. After the match Newton stated that he felt the reason Hughes fell to the mat was because he was rendered unconscious from the triangle choke. This was confirmed by Hughes himself upon reviewing the tape of the match Hughes can be heard telling his corner after the fight "I was out".
The result was officially announced as a KO at 1:27 of the second round. The slam is considered to be one of the greatest in MMA history.

He successfully defended his championship belt at UFC 36: Worlds Collide, defeating former Shooto Middleweight Champion Hayato Sakurai via TKO due to strikes at 3:01 of the fourth round. In the first round of the fight, Hughes spent all the time either clinching Sakurai up against the fence, or ripping his feet out from under him. In round 2, Sakurai landed a right hand that sent Hughes to the mat; despite this, Matt won the round by spending three minutes hitting Sakurai with elbows from the top position. At the start of the third round, Hughes quickly slammed Sakurai to the ground, again staying three minutes on top. He looked too strong for Sakurai. Hughes finished the bout in the 4th round, by taking down Sakurai and transitioning to full mount. After one minute of ground-and-pound onslaught, the contest was over as Sakurai had no answer for the champion.

Hughes faced Carlos Newton in their subsequent rematch at the main event of UFC 38: Brawl at the Hall, in the promotion's debut in the United Kingdom. He won the fight by technical knockout when he successfully trapped Newton in a modified crucifix position, which allowed him to rain unanswered blows on Newton's face until the referee stopped the contest at 3:27 of round 4.

In his next title defense, Hughes fought Gil Castillo at UFC 40: Vendetta, defeating the former Middleweight contender via TKO. Hughes started the match with a big slam and then began to attack from Castillo's guard with elbows and punches. Hughes easily avoided any submission attempts and looked far stronger than Castillo. As he passed to half guard, Castillo was bleeding above his left eye. The challenger's only offense was a weak triangle choke that went nowhere. The round ended with Hughes on top, ground-and-pounding his opponent. Between rounds doctors ruled that the resulting cut was too severe to continue, and Hughes was declared the winner due to stoppage.

At UFC 42: Sudden Impact, Hughes faced future UFC Lightweight Champion Sean Sherk, winning via unanimous decision. Hughes started the action by taking Sherk down immediately, passing to half guard. Sherk was able to stand for a few seconds before Hughes took him down again. In round two, they started to trade punches, but eventually Hughes took Sherk down. Like the first round, they stood up for a moment. At the beginning of the third round, Sherk took Hughes down, while Hughes attempted a kimura from the bottom. A late stand up led to a second takedown by Sherk. Round 4 saw Hughes using his strength to control the challenger on the ground. Sherk took Hughes down again in the fifth round, but the champion controlled the rest of the time sprawl-and-brawling as he finished on top. With the victory, he became the first man to defeat Sherk.

Hughes faced former WFA Welterweight Champion Frank Trigg at the main event of UFC 45: Revolution. This event marked the UFC's 10th anniversary. After a tactical grappling match-up early on, Trigg fell victim to a standing rear naked choke at 3:45 of the first round. The choke earned Hughes the Tapout of the Night Submission Award.

Loss to Penn and regaining the title
Hughes kept the title until UFC 46: Supernatural, when he was submitted by Hawaiian Brazilian jiu-jitsu specialist B.J. Penn via rear naked choke at 4:39 of the first round, in a fight he was heavily favored to win. The title was vacated following a contract dispute between Penn and the UFC, which promptly stripped him of the welterweight title, claiming Penn had breached his contract and that the signing constituted him refusing to defend his title. Penn filed suit against UFC and publicized his side of the conflict, claiming his contract had expired. Penn filed a motion to stop UFC from awarding a new welterweight title, but that motion was denied.

Hughes faced Penn's training partner Renato Verissimo at UFC 48: Payback, winning via unanimous decision (30-27; 30–27; 29-28). He was caught in a very tight triangle choke in the first round, but after winning the second and third rounds, was awarded with the victory.

Hughes regained the vacant welterweight title by submitting Canadian contender Georges St-Pierre via armbar in the final second of the first round at UFC 50: The War of '04. The fight was competitive. Hughes took GSP down twice and landed a huge slam. Hughes was in trouble at the beginning of the bout as St-Pierre unloaded a spinning back kick into his ribs. The submission earned Hughes his second Tapout of the Night. Obviously disappointed at the time, St. Pierre admitted afterward that he had lost before he ever stepped into the Octagon. He had regarded Hughes as his idol, not as someone he could beat.

Hughes successfully retained his title against Trigg in their historic rematch at UFC 52: Couture vs. Liddell 2. Accidentally hit in the groin early in the first round, Hughes looked to the referee for assistance; however, the referee had not seen the strike and Trigg capitalized on Hughes's distraction by staggering him with a barrage of punches. The fight quickly went to the ground, with Trigg ground-and-pounding Hughes, then attempting a rear naked choke. After nearly two minutes of struggling, Hughes broke free, picked Trigg up, carried him across the Octagon and slammed him to the ground. Hughes then ground-and-pounded Trigg before securing the victory with a rear naked choke of his own, in what is considered one of the UFC's greatest fights. and comebacks in MMA history This fight is UFC President Dana White's favorite match in combat sport history. He was awarded the Tapout of the Night for the third time in his career.

Hughes's next fight took place at UFC 56: Full Force, where he was scheduled to fight Judo practitioner Karo Parisyan. After Parisyan suffered a hamstring injury and could not fight, Joe Riggs took his place. The match was originally scheduled as a title bout, but since Riggs could not meet the 170-pound weight limit, it became a non-title fight. It marked the first time for the UFC that a title fight had to be called off for this reason.

Hughes defeated Riggs in the first round by submission via kimura from the half-guard at 3:28. The armlock earned Hughes his last Tapout of the Night award.

At UFC 60: Hughes vs. Gracie, on May 27, 2006, Hughes defeated Brazilian Jiu-Jitsu legend and UFC Hall of Famer Royce Gracie in a non-title, catch-weight bout by TKO (strikes) at 4:39 of the first round. Before the stoppage, Gracie was caught in an armlock from the side mount position; although Hughes appeared to have the submission in place, Gracie would not tap out. Hughes stated that he felt his arm pop and realized he would never tap, so instead of breaking his arm, opted to seek a different position . The event drew 620,000 buys, becoming the best-selling pay-per-view in UFC history, and was the first to break the $20 million mark in gross PPV sales.

Hughes was scheduled to fight Georges St-Pierre in a rematch at UFC 63, but after St-Pierre sustained a severe groin injury, the UFC announced that B.J. Penn would replace him in the title fight. At this point in their careers, Penn was the only mixed martial artist to beat Hughes after March 2001. In fact, it was Hughes's only loss in his last 19 fights. In the bout, Penn controlled the first two rounds, but sustained a rib injury during the scramble to take Hughes's back in round two. He was visibly different in the third round, appearing exhausted and missing punches he was landing earlier. Hughes was able to take Penn to the mat, and in side-control crucifix position rained punches on Penn's head until referee "Big" John McCarthy stopped the fight at 3:53 of the third round. In the process, Hughes became the first man to stop Penn in a fight. Both fighters were awarded the Fight of the Night bonus. In an interview on Penn's personal website, Penn stated that by round three he could hardly breathe and had no "mobility in his core".  Despite the injury, Penn congratulated Hughes, calling him a great fighter and saying he deserved the victory.

St-Pierre stepped into the ring to promote his upcoming title fight against Hughes, stating that he was glad that Hughes won his fight, but that he was "not impressed" by Hughes's performance. According to both commentator Joe Rogan and Hughes's own autobiography, Hughes was unhappy with St-Pierre's statement. Hughes said that they "had words" off-camera shortly thereafter. St-Pierre apologized, saying he had misunderstood something Hughes had said on the microphone and did not mean to offend him.

Loss to St-Pierre
On November 18, 2006, at UFC 65: Bad Intentions, Georges St-Pierre defeated Hughes by TKO via strikes at 1:25 of round two, ending Hughes's title reign. In the first round, Hughes sustained two unintentional kicks near the groin; after Hughes went down from the second kick, St-Pierre was given a warning by referee "Big" John McCarthy. However, Hughes stated in the post-fight interview that the second kick mainly affected his legs, rather than his groin. Nearing the end of the first round, St-Pierre landed a Superman punch, which floored Hughes. St-Pierre then followed up with strikes on his stunned opponent. When it appeared that the fight would be stopped, the bell rang signaling the end of the first round. In the second round St-Pierre ended the fight with a head kick which stunned Hughes and knocked him to the mat. He followed up with a flurry of punches and elbows that forced McCarthy to stop the contest with 3:35 left in the round.

Return
On March 3, 2007, Hughes returned to the Octagon for UFC 68: Uprising, defeating Chris Lytle by unanimous decision, winning 30–27 on all three judges' scorecards. Hughes secured an armbar at the end of round one, but Lytle was saved by the bell. Hughes opened the second round with a quick takedown, moving up to side-control and then landed an elbow that cut Lytle. Finally, Hughes mounted his opponent, but Lytle swept and was able to reverse that position. In the third round, Hughes unsuccessfully tried an armbar again before the horn sounded.

In late mid-2007, Hughes left the Miletich camp with Miletich stablemate Robbie Lawler, longtime boxing coach Matt Pena, and wrestling/conditioning teacher Marc Fiore to form The H.I.T. (Hughes Intensive Training) Squad in Granite City, Illinois.

The Ultimate Fighter 
In 2005, Hughes participated as a coach opposite Rich Franklin in the second season of the Spike TV reality television series, The Ultimate Fighter. This was the first season where the coaches did not fight each other after the conclusion of the show, because Franklin and Hughes were champions in different weight divisions. In 2007, Hughes participated as a guest coach for long-time friend and training partner, Jens Pulver during The Ultimate Fighter 5 season.

Hughes agreed to head coach again for The Ultimate Fighter 6, alongside then-UFC Welterweight Champion, Matt Serra. Despite the fact that after the preliminary round, Team Hughes's record was 2–6, both Mac Danzig and Tommy Speer of Team Hughes made it to the finals. In 2011, Hughes appeared as guest coach during The Ultimate Fighter 13 season for friend and former UFC Heavyweight Champion Brock Lesnar.

Interim Welterweight Championship bout

Following a championship win by Matt Serra over Georges St-Pierre at UFC 69, UFC President Dana White announced that Hughes would fight for the World Welterweight title in November 2007 against Serra. This fight was later changed to December 29, 2007, in Las Vegas, at UFC 79: Nemesis. On November 23, however, Serra sustained a herniated disc in his lower back and informed UFC that he would not be able to compete for an indeterminate time. As a replacement for the title match, the UFC quickly signed a rubber match between Hughes and St-Pierre that would also be for the Interim UFC Welterweight Championship. Despite his best efforts, Hughes was unable to mount a serious offense on St-Pierre, who easily avoided Hughes's takedown attempts, while taking Hughes down at will and using Hughes's own ground-and-pound style against him. Near the end of the second round, St-Pierre attempted a kimura on Hughes's right arm that he escaped, but in a reversal of their first fight, St-Pierre was able to twist it into a straight armbar with fifteen seconds remaining in the round. Hughes fought the extension, but with his left hand trapped between the mat and St-Pierre's legs, was forced to submit verbally at 4:54 of the second round. In the post-fight interview, Hughes praised St-Pierre as the better fighter:

Hughes vs. Alves

Hughes fought Thiago Alves at UFC 85: Bedlam on June 7, 2008. Hughes lost to Alves by TKO at 1:02 of the second round. After receiving a powerful flying knee, he dropped to the ground with his own left knee pinned behind his hips, ultimately leaving him with a torn MCL and partially torn PCL. Hughes took the fight on short notice as a favor to UFC. Alves failed to make weight for the match, but Hughes elected to fight him at a catch weight anyway. He stated in his blog:

Hughes vs. Serra and future

Immediately after the Alves fight, Hughes stated that he had "one more fight" left in him, and that he wanted to fight Matt Serra. Their rivalry stemmed from the time when Serra was a contestant on The Ultimate Fighter and Hughes was guest coach. Serra did not like the way Hughes criticized other contestants on the show and was disgusted when Hughes constantly picked on Georges St-Pierre during a lunch break and bragged about his submission victory. On January 9, 2009, Hughes confirmed on his blog that UFC 98 would likely be the day he and Serra met in the Octagon. UFC confirmed the fight.

Hughes won the grudge match against Serra at UFC 98 via unanimous decision. In the first round, both fighters collided heads, and Hughes got the worst of it. Despite this, Serra could not finish the fight and Hughes recovered rapidly. In the second round, Hughes controlled his opponent on the ground with his wrestling skills. The final round saw the former champions taking each other down and exchanging punches. The back and forth action rewarded both competitors with Fight of the Night honors. After the fight Hughes and Serra embraced each other and ended their feud. Hughes posted on his blog: "When the fight was over, I was pretty confident I was going to get my hand raised. Some people have asked why I raised his hand at the end. Actually I didn't, he raised mine. He also told me that, no matter what the decision was, he was done with the rivalry". After the fight Hughes said, "I think I have a few more fights left in me."

Hughes vs. Gracie
Hughes then signed a multi-fight deal with the UFC. Hughes defeated Renzo Gracie, the 1st cousin once removed of his opponent at UFC 60, via third round TKO at UFC 112: Invincible, setting the record for most UFC wins with 17. Both of them seemed very comfortable fighting on their feet in the early going, with Gracie landing the cleaner and more effective punches and also landing a couple of kicks. Hughes started the second round with powerful leg kicks, but after that Gracie returned to his in-and-out punching style. Hughes got double underhooks and managed to take Gracie down briefly. In the final round Hughes connected with a right hook to Gracie's chin, then connected with a leg kick and another punch. With two minutes to go he knocked Gracie down with a leg kick. Gracie took all the time he could before Hughes helped him up and then dropped him with a second leg kick. Gracie stalled again, but when he finally stood up Hughes floored him with a punch, let him get up and then attacked again. Hughes knocked Gracie down again with a fourth punch, when referee Herb Dean ended it.

Hall of Fame and Hughes vs. Almeida
On May 28, 2010, Hughes was inducted into the UFC Hall of Fame.

Fighting Renzo Gracie student and 3rd degree Brazilian Jiu-Jitsu black belt Ricardo Almeida, Hughes rendered him unconscious with a Dave Schultz front headlock at 3:15 of round 1, on August 7, 2010, at UFC 117: Silva vs. Sonnen. Hughes landed a huge left hook that knocked Almeida down, sinking in the very deep choke which earned him the Submission of the Night honors. Almeida requested the fight after watching his mentor lose to Hughes at UFC 112 back in April. Hughes now had four wins over mixed martial artists with ties to the Gracies, including UFC pioneer Royce Gracie, the prior mentioned Renzo Gracie and former champ Serra.

Hughes vs. Penn III

Hughes faced BJ Penn on November 20, 2010, in a rubber match at UFC 123: Rampage vs. Machida, after their previous two fights at UFC 46 and UFC 63. Penn came out strong in the first few seconds of the opening round, catching one of Hughes's kicks and knocking him off balance with a counter hook. Penn then connected with an overhand right that dropped Hughes, following up with three clean shots to the jaw. The bout was ended at 21 seconds into the first round, with Hughes trilogy against Penn ending at 1–2. The fight marked the first time Hughes had been knocked out (he had previously lost via technical knockout). Post-fight Hughes hinted that the loss moved him one step closer to retirement.

Hughes vs. Koscheck
Hughes was expected to face Diego Sanchez on September 24, 2011, at UFC 135: Jones vs. Rampage. However, Sanchez missed the bout with an injury and was replaced by Josh Koscheck. Hughes suffered a KO loss to Koscheck at 4:59 of the first round. Hughes showed improved striking, but ultimately succumbed to Koscheck's power punches.

Retirement
The UFC announced on January 24, 2013, that Matt Hughes retired from fighting and was named a Vice President of Athlete Development and Government Relations.

Theme music
In the UFC, Hughes frequently used the song "A Country Boy Can Survive" by Hank Williams, Jr. as he made his entrance towards the Octagon. At the UFC 56 live broadcast, Joe Rogan said: "My favorite walk-out song in all the UFC, ′A country boy can survive.′"

Autobiography

Hughes released his autobiography, Made in America: The Most Dominant Champion in UFC History, co-written with Michael Malice, on January 1, 2008. The book debuted at No. 21 on the New York Times bestseller list.

Television Series

Trophy Hunters TV
Since January 2011, Hughes is the host of hunting program Trophy Hunters TV, which airs in Outdoor Channel three times a week. The show is closely related to the Texas Trophy Hunters Association.

Uncaged with Matt Hughes
On July 4, 2013, Hughes became the host of Uncaged with Matt Hughes, which airs Saturdays on the Sportsman Channel.

The Takedown with Matt Hughes
On October 7, 2014, Hughes parented with Producer Joe David Garza and became the host of a new series entitled The Takedown with Matt Hughes, which aired on Sundays on the Sportsman Channel.  The series was nominated for "Best New Series" in 2015 at the Sportsman's Choice Awards.

Criticisms
Hughes has been criticized by animal advocates, including former UFC fighter and commentator Dan Hardy, for his trophy hunting. In response to outrage over trophy hunting pictures posted on his Twitter account in 2012, Hughes called some of the commenters "PETA idiots" and told them to stop following his page.

Personal life
Hughes is a born again Christian and regularly posts Bible verses on his website. Hughes and his wife have two daughters together. She also has a son from a previous relationship. The couple's second daughter was born on January 2, 2010. Matt and his twin brother were born on their father's birthday.

On June 16, 2017, Hughes was hospitalized with a serious head injury after a train struck the passenger side of his truck at a rail crossing near his home in Montgomery County, Illinois. On June 18, Hughes's family released a statement that he had no broken bones or internal injuries but was unconscious and unresponsive.  They were working with the Triumph Over Tragedy Foundation to determine next steps for care. The Foundation, of which Hughes was a board member for five years, provides care for families with brain and spinal cord injuries. On September 23, 2017, he returned to the hospital to honor the hospital staff who took care of him while he was there. On January 14, 2018, Hughes returned ringside as a guest of honor during UFC Fight Night in St. Louis. On September 19, 2019, news surfaced that Hughes sued Norfolk Southern Railway and several of its employees for the 2017 train crash.

Domestic violence allegations
In May 2019 Hughes's wife filed a restraining order against him after she accused him of several incidents of domestic violence. His brother Mark Hughes also filed a restraining order against him claiming that Matt choked his son and tried to destroy his tractor. Hughes filed to divorce his wife on May 27, 2019. In September 2019, Hughes's attorneys revealed that the brothers had settled the case.

Championships and achievements

Mixed martial arts

Mixed martial arts record

|-
| Loss
| align=center| 45–9
| Josh Koscheck
| KO (punches)
| UFC 135
| 
| align=center| 1
| align=center| 4:59
| Denver, Colorado, United States
| 
|-
| Loss
| align=center| 45–8
| B.J. Penn
| KO (punches)
| UFC 123
| 
| align=center| 1
| align=center| 0:21
| Auburn Hills, Michigan, United States
| 
|-
| Win
| align=center| 45–7
| Ricardo Almeida
| Technical Submission (anaconda choke)
| UFC 117
| 
| align=center| 1
| align=center| 3:15
| Oakland, California, United States
| 
|-
| Win
| align=center| 44–7
| Renzo Gracie
| TKO (punches)
| UFC 112
| 
| align=center| 3
| align=center| 4:40
| Abu Dhabi, United Arab Emirates
| 
|-
| Win
| align=center| 43–7
| Matt Serra
| Decision (unanimous)
| UFC 98
| 
| align=center| 3
| align=center| 5:00
| Las Vegas, Nevada, United States
| 
|-
| Loss
| align=center| 42–7
| Thiago Alves
| TKO (flying knee and punches)
| UFC 85
| 
| align=center| 2
| align=center| 1:02
| London, England
| 
|-
| Loss
| align=center| 42–6
| Georges St-Pierre
| Submission (armbar)
| UFC 79
| 
| align=center| 2
| align=center| 4:54
| Las Vegas, Nevada, United States
| 
|-
| Win
| align=center| 42–5
| Chris Lytle
| Decision (unanimous)
| UFC 68
| 
| align=center| 3
| align=center| 5:00
| Columbus, Ohio, United States
| 
|-
| Loss
| align=center| 41–5
| Georges St-Pierre
| TKO (head kick and punches)
| UFC 65
| 
| align=center| 2
| align=center| 1:25
| Sacramento, California, United States
| 
|-
| Win
| align=center| 41–4
| B.J. Penn
| TKO (punches)
| UFC 63
| 
| align=center| 3
| align=center| 3:53
| Anaheim, California, United States
| 
|-
| Win
| align=center| 40–4
| Royce Gracie
| TKO (punches)
| UFC 60
| 
| align=center| 1
| align=center| 4:39
| Los Angeles, California, United States
| 
|-
| Win
| align=center| 39–4
| Joe Riggs
| Submission (kimura)
| UFC 56
| 
| align=center| 1
| align=center| 3:26
| Las Vegas, Nevada, United States
| 
|-
| Win
| align=center| 38–4
| Frank Trigg
| Submission (rear-naked choke)
| UFC 52
| 
| align=center| 1
| align=center| 4:05
| Las Vegas, Nevada, United States
| 
|-
| Win
| align=center| 37–4
| Georges St-Pierre
| Submission (armbar)
| UFC 50
| 
| align=center| 1
| align=center| 4:59
| Atlantic City, New Jersey, United States
| 
|-
| Win
| align=center| 36–4
| Renato Verissimo
| Decision (unanimous)
| UFC 48
| 
| align=center| 3
| align=center| 5:00
| Las Vegas, Nevada, United States
| 
|-
| Loss
| align=center| 35–4
| B.J. Penn
| Submission (rear-naked choke)
| UFC 46
| 
| align=center| 1
| align=center| 4:39
| Las Vegas, Nevada, United States
| 
|-
| Win
| align=center| 35–3
| Frank Trigg
| Submission (rear-naked choke)
| UFC 45
| 
| align=center| 1
| align=center| 3:54
| Uncasville, Connecticut, United States
| 
|-
| Win
| align=center| 34–3
| Sean Sherk
| Decision (unanimous)
| UFC 42
| 
| align=center| 5
| align=center| 5:00
| Miami, Florida, United States
| 
|-
| Win
| align=center| 33–3
| Gil Castillo
| TKO (doctor stoppage)
| UFC 40
| 
| align=center| 1
| align=center| 5:00
| Las Vegas, Nevada, United States
| 
|-
| Win
| align=center| 32–3
| Carlos Newton
| TKO (punches)
| UFC 38
| 
| align=center| 4
| align=center| 3:27
| London, England
| 
|-
| Win
| align=center| 31–3
| Hayato Sakurai
| TKO (punches)
| UFC 36
| 
| align=center| 4
| align=center| 3:01
| Las Vegas, Nevada, United States
| 
|-
| Win
| align=center| 30–3
| Carlos Newton
| KO (slam)
| UFC 34
| 
| align=center| 2
| align=center| 1:27
| Las Vegas, Nevada, United States
| 
|-
| Win
| align=center| 29–3
| Steve Gomm
| TKO (punches)
| Extreme Challenge 43
| 
| align=center| 2
| align=center| 3:18
| Orem, Utah, United States
| 
|-
| Win
| align=center| 28–3
| Hiromitsu Kanehara
| Decision (majority)
| Rings: 10th Anniversary
| 
| align=center| 3
| align=center| 5:00
| Tokyo, Japan
| 
|-
| Win
| align=center| 27–3
| Chatt Lavender
| Submission (arm-triangle choke)
| Extreme Challenge 41
| 
| align=center| 3
| align=center| 2:31
| Davenport, Iowa, United States
| 
|-
| Win
| align=center| 26–3
| Scott Johnson
| KO (punch)
| Extreme Challenge 40
| 
| align=center| 1
| align=center| 3:24
| Springfield, Illinois, United States
| 
|-
| Win
| align=center| 25–3
| John Cronk
| TKO (submission to punches)
| Gladiators 14
| 
| align=center| 1
| align=center| N/A
| Omaha, Nebraska, United States
| 
|-
| Win
| align=center| 24–3
| Bruce Nelson
| Submission (guillotine choke)
| Freestyle Combat Challenge 4
| 
| align=center| 1
| align=center| 3:01
| Racine, Wisconsin, United States
| 
|-
| Win
| align=center| 23–3
| Brett Al-azzawi
| Submission (armbar)
| Rings USA: Battle of Champions
| 
| align=center| 1
| align=center| 3:27
| Council Bluffs, Iowa, United States
| 
|-
| Loss
| align=center| 22–3
| José Landi-Jons
| KO (knee)
| Shidokan Jitsu: Warriors War 1
| 
| align=center| 1
| align=center| 4:45
| Kuwait City, Kuwait
| 
|-
| Loss
| align=center| 22–2
| Dennis Hallman
| Submission (armbar)
| UFC 29
| 
| align=center| 1
| align=center| 0:20
| Tokyo, Japan
| 
|-
| Win
| align=center| 22–1
| Maynard Marcum
| Submission (keylock)
| Rings Australia: Free Fight Battle
| 
| align=center| 1
| align=center| 6:29
| Brisbane, Australia
| 
|-
| Win
| align=center| 21–1
| Robbie Newman
| Submission (arm-triangle choke)
| Rings USA: Rising Stars Final
| 
| align=center| 1
| align=center| 1:40
| Moline, Illinois, United States
| 
|-
| Win
| align=center| 20–1
| Chris Haseman
| Decision (unanimous)
| Rings: Millennium Combine 3
| 
| align=center| 2
| align=center| 5:00
| Osaka, Japan
| 
|-
| Win
| align=center| 19–1
| Joe Guist
| Submission (armbar)
| Extreme Challenge 35
| 
| align=center| 1
| align=center| 2:45
| Davenport, Iowa, United States
| 
|-
| Win
| align=center| 18–1
| Marcelo Aguiar
| TKO (doctor stoppage)
| UFC 26
| 
| align=center| 1
| align=center| 4:34
| Cedar Rapids, Iowa, United States
| 
|-
| Win
| align=center| 17–1
| Shawn Peters
| Submission (arm-triangle choke)
| Extreme Challenge 32
| 
| align=center| 1
| align=center| 2:52
| Springfield, Illinois, United States
| 
|-
| Win
| align=center| 16–1
| Alexandre Barros
| Decision (unanimous)
| WEF 9: World Class
| 
| align=center| 3
| align=center| 5:00
| Evansville, Indiana, United States
| 
|-
| Win
| align=center| 15–1
| Eric Davila
| Submission (keylock)
| SuperBrawl 17
| 
| align=center| 2
| align=center| 3:24
| Honolulu, Hawaii, United States
| 
|-
| Win
| align=center| 14–1
| Jorge Pereira
| TKO (doctor stoppage)
| WEF 8: Goin' Platinum
| 
| align=center| 1
| align=center| 6:00
| Rome, Georgia, United States
| 
|-
| Win
| align=center| 13–1
| Daniel Vianna
| TKO (cut)
| JKD Challenge 4
| 
| align=center| 1
| align=center| N/A
| Chicago, Illinois, United States
| 
|-
| Win
| align=center| 12–1
| LaVerne Clark
| Submission (rear-naked choke)
| Extreme Challenge 29
| 
| align=center| 2
| align=center| 1:35
| Hayward, Wisconsin, United States
| 
|-
| Win
| align=center| 11–1
| Tom Schmitz
| TKO (eye injury)
| Extreme Challenge 29
| 
| align=center| 1
| align=center| 0:48
| Hayward, Wisconsin, United States
| 
|-
| Win
| align=center| 10–1
| Joe Doerksen
| TKO (submission to knees and punches)
| Extreme Challenge 29
| 
| align=center| 2
| align=center| 0:25
| Hayward, Wisconsin, United States
| 
|-
| Win
| align=center| 9–1
| Valeri Ignatov
| Decision (unanimous)
| UFC 22
| 
| align=center| 3
| align=center| 5:00
| Lake Charles, Louisiana, United States
| 
|-
| Win
| align=center| 8–1
| Akihiro Gono
| Decision (unanimous)
| Shooto - 10th Anniversary Event
| 
| align=center| 3
| align=center| 5:00
| Yokohama, Japan
| 
|-
| Win
| align=center| 7–1
| Erick Snyder
| TKO (slam)
| Jeet Kune Do Challenge 4
| 
| align=center| 1
| align=center| N/A
| Chicago, Illinois, United States
| 
|-
| Win
| align=center| 6–1
| Joe Stern
| TKO (punches)
| Extreme Challenge 23
| 
| align=center| 1
| align=center| 2:30
| Indianapolis, Indiana, United States
| 
|-
| Win
| align=center| 5–1
| Ryan Stout
| TKO (corner stoppage)
| Extreme Shootfighting
| 
| align=center| 2
| align=center| 5:00
| Waukesha, Wisconsin, United States
| 
|-
| Loss
| align=center| 4–1
| Dennis Hallman
| Technical Submission (guillotine choke)
| Extreme Challenge 21
| 
| align=center| 1
| align=center| 0:17
| Hayward, Wisconsin, United States
| 
|-
| Win
| align=center| 4–0
| Dave Menne
| Decision (unanimous)
| Extreme Challenge 21
| 
| align=center| 1
| align=center| 15:00
| Hayward, Wisconsin, United States
| 
|-
| Win
| align=center| 3–0
| Victor Hunsaker
| TKO (punches)
| Extreme Challenge 21
| 
| align=center| 1
| align=center| 1:39
| Hayward, Wisconsin, United States
| 
|-
| Win
| align=center| 2–0
| Craig Quick
| TKO (submission to punches)
| Jeet Kune Do Challenge 2
| 
| align=center| 1
| align=center| N/A
| Chicago, Illinois, United States
| 
|-
| Win
| align=center| 1–0
| Erick Snyder
| KO (slam)
| Jeet Kune Do Challenge 1
| 
| align=center| 1
| align=center| 0:15
| Chicago, Illinois, United States
|

Pay-per-view bouts

Submission grappling record

Matt Hughes fought Tito Ortiz for the bronze medal (3rd place) and was defeated.

Filmography

Video games

See also
List of male mixed martial artists
List of UFC champions

References

External links

Matt Hughes' training facility
Matt Hughes profile at the National Wrestling Hall of Fame

1973 births
Living people
American male mixed martial artists
Mixed martial artists from Illinois
Ultimate Fighting Championship champions
American practitioners of Brazilian jiu-jitsu
Welterweight mixed martial artists
Mixed martial artists utilizing collegiate wrestling
Mixed martial artists utilizing Brazilian jiu-jitsu
American male sport wrestlers
American twins
Twin sportspeople
Identical twins
People from Montgomery County, Illinois
Lincoln College (Illinois) alumni
Christians from Illinois
American hunters
Ultimate Fighting Championship male fighters